Wushu at the 2001 Southeast Asian Games was held in Penang International Sports Arena, Penang, Malaysia from 9 to 11 September 2001.

Medal table 
Legend

Medalists

Men's taolu

Men's sanda

Women's talou

References

External links
 

2001
2001 Southeast Asian Games events
2001 in wushu (sport)